Kara Petersen is an American stunt actress best known for her portrayal of the District 6 female tribute in the 2012 film, The Hunger Games, as well as several appearances in Disney and Nickelodeon sitcoms. She currently has been credited over 70 times since the start of her career. Petersen stands at four feet eleven inches, which has led her to be a double for many child actors. She has a background in both gymnastics and dancing, where she has also appeared as a gymnast and a body double in films and television about the sport.

Career
Petersen began her stunt career in 2004 with Quintuplets. Since then, she has appeared in programs such as All That, Agents of S.H.I.E.L.D. and Make It or Break It. She appeared in the film, Jurassic World as a stunt double for Ty Simpkins.
Recently, Petersen has doubled for Cameron Boyce (Jessie), Ryan Lee (Super 8) and Jill Basey (Crash & Bernstein).

Filmography
For all credits, Petersen was a stunt performer or double, except for her appearance in Cooties. In productions such as The Hunger Games, Maze Runner: The Scorch Trials and Video Game High School, she served as both a character and a stunt performer.

Awards and nominations

References

External links

 
Stunt demo

Place of birth missing (living people)
Year of birth missing (living people)
Living people
American stunt performers
21st-century American actresses